Trombidium poriceps is a species of mite in the genus Trombidium in the family Trombidiidae. It is found in Europe.

Name
The species name is derived from Latin porus "pore" and caput "head".

References
 Synopsis of the described Arachnida of the World: Trombidiidae

Further reading
  (1904): Acarologische Aanteekeningen.

Trombidiidae
Arachnids of Europe
Animals described in 1904
Taxa named by Anthonie Cornelis Oudemans